St Catherine-by-the-Sea is a Church of England church in Holworth, Dorset, England. The small wooden church, which forms part of the Watercombe Benefice, holds a service on the fourth Sunday of the month.

History

The church of St Catherine-by-the-Sea was built to serve the scattered population in and around Holworth, all of whom were at least two miles from a church. In circa 1887, the Bishop of Salisbury, the Right Rev. John Wordsworth, gave permission to Rev. Robert Linklater of Holworth House for Holy Communion to be celebrated in the house's private chapel. The congregation quickly became too large and services were subsequently held in the house's entrance hall. In circa 1904, a large kitchen in a nearby cottage owned by Mr. and Mrs. Edward Duke of Dorchester was also made available to local inhabitants for Divine service.

A small wooden church, dedicated to St Catherine-by-the-Sea, opened for Divine service on 15 July 1906. The woodwork of the church was done by Mr. Moore of Owermoigne and all masonry work by Mr. Walter Toms of Winfrith Newburgh. In August 1906, the chapel was presented with a bible gifted by Mr. and Mrs. E. Barnaby-Duke. It was dedicated on 12 August and first used during that day's evening service by Rev. Pickard-Cambridge, the rector of Warmwell.

On the death of Mrs. Mary Catherine Linklater, Rev. Linklater's wife, in 1942, she bequeathed £200 towards the church and also part of her property at Holworth for its future upkeep.

2010 refurbishment and extension

In 2002, it was discovered that the Linklater Trust, which had been left by Rev. Linklater on his death in 1915, had approximately £200,000 to spend on the church. Proposals were made to demolish the existing building and build a replacement, which was met with opposition from members of the congregation. A petition was launched to retain the existing church. In 2003, after facing pressure from local opposition and from Save Britain's Heritage, the trustees dropped their redevelopment plans.

In 2010, planning permission was granted to carry out alterations to the church, which included adding a single-storey extension on the north and east sides. In addition to the extensions, the church was extensively refurbished. A new east window, designed by Simon Whistler, was installed as part of the project, as was a new electric organ.

Fittings
The church's bell was gifted by Lieutenant Commander Michael Forder of the Royal Navy. It originally belonged to the S-class submarine HMS Sleuth and was given to Forder by the Admiralty. It hung outside his house for a number of years before he gifted it to the church.

References

External links
 Watercombe Benefice website

Churches in Dorset
Church of England church buildings in Dorset
Wooden churches in England